Impurity is a studio album by British rock band New Model Army, released in 1990.

It was the first album without bassist Jason Harris, who had been replaced by Peter Nice (better known as "Nelson"). It was the band's last studio album with EMI.

The album sees the band venturing further into the musical territory which they began exploring on their previous album, Thunder and Consolation (1989). Violinist Ed Alleyne-Johnson was again a collaborator. It also contained the guitar work of Adrian Portas.

The album reached #23 on the UK albums chart in October 1990.

Critical reception
Trouser Press wrote that the album "exemplifies a fervent, trend- bucking band that has remained true to its original goals."

Singles
The singles released from the album were "Get Me Out" (September 1990), "Purity" (October 1990) and "Space" (June 1991).

Versions
The LP contained 11 tracks, the CD version included the bonus track "Marrakesh".

The German gatefold-version of the LP had a slightly different cover-artwork. The band logo is printed in light-grey instead of the other version's red logo.

The album was remastered and reissued in 2005 with a bonus disc containing rarities, B-sides and live tracks.

Track listing
All tracks written by Justin Sullivan and Robert Heaton except where otherwise noted
Timings taken from 1990 CD version
"Get Me Out" – 3:19
"Space" (Sullivan, Heaton, Nelson) – 3:25
"Innocence" – 4:52
"Purity" (Sullivan) – 4:47
"Whirlwind" – 4:14
"Marrakesh" (Sullivan) – 3:13
"Lust for Power" (Sullivan) – 4:10
"Bury the Hatchet" – 3:18
"Eleven Years" – 3:51
"Lurhstaap" – 4:36
"Before I Get Old" (Sullivan) – 3:53
"Vanity" (Sullivan) – 5:31

2005 bonus disc
"Prison" (Sullivan) – 4:13
"Curse" – 3:53
"Far Better Thing" – 5:18
"Lurhstaap" (acoustic version) – 3:46
"Whirlwind" (live) – 4:06
"Space" (live) – 3:45
"Get Me Out" (live) – 3:31
"Purity" (live) – 4:14
"Innocence" (live) – 4:22
"Lurhstaap" (live) – 4:34

Personnel

Production
New Model Army – producer
Pat Collier – producer, mixed by, recorded by (additional)
Jessica Corcoran – engineer
John Cornfield – recorded by
Tim Young – mastered by
Joolz Denby – artwork
Keith Faulkener – layout, artwork processing
Michael Faulkener – layout, artwork processing

Musicians
Justin Sullivan – vocals, guitar, keyboards
Robert Heaton – drums, guitar, backing vocals
Nelson – bass, guitar, keyboards, spoons, backing vocals
Ed Alleyne-Johnson – violins
Adrian Portas – guitar
Joolz Denby – voice on "Space"

References

External links
discogs.com
The Official NMA Website
Original CD liner notes
Everyhit.com

New Model Army (band) albums
1990 albums